Theophidack "Kofi" Nti (3 April 1977 – 26 April 2017) was a Ghanaian footballer.

Career
He joined Nania F.C. from the second division side in Madina United in 2001, during this period he led the team to be promoted into the Ghanaian first division league. In 2003, he captained the team in its first major tournament in Switzerland in which Nania won a bronze medal, he won an MVP award in that tournament. In 2004, the team won a silver medal in Germany, during its second outing in Europe, Nti captained the team and won an award as one of the most outstanding midfielders of the tournament. He captained Nania in another tournament in Switzerland the same year in which Nania won a silver medal. In addition, Nti led Nania to qualify from the second division to the first division in August 2004, he moved in January 2005 to Richmond Kickers Future.

College Experience and Honors
In college, Nti led the University of Ghana soccer team to win the University League in 1999, in 2001, he led the same team to win the first West African University games held in Ghana.

International
Played with Ghanaian Under-20 National Team in 1995.

Death
Nti passed away unexpectedly on 26 April 2017 at the age of 40.

References

External links
 Richmond Kickers Profile

1977 births
Living people
Ghanaian footballers
Ghanaian expatriate footballers
Association football midfielders
Expatriate soccer players in the United States
F.C. Nania players
Richmond Kickers Future players
USL League Two players